The condolence ceremony or condolence council is a part of the Haudenosaunee Great Law of Peace. It governs succession to political offices after a leader dies.

The ceremony is held in the community whose leader has died. Attendees are divided into two moieties: the clearminded and the downcast or bereaved. The ceremony progresses through several stages, including a recitation of the Great Law. Through the ceremony, new leaders are appointed to replace those who have died. It was typically the first item on the agenda when a Haudenosaunee council met.

Among other things, the ceremony recalls the Great Peacemaker's condolence of Hiawatha and the "transformation" of Tadodaho from a state of confusion and disorder to a state of peace.

Notes

Sources

Further reading 
 
 
 

Iroquois culture